The Marine Raider Regiment (MRR), formerly known as the Marine Special Operations Regiment (MSOR), is a special operations force of the United States Marine Corps, which is a part of Marine Corps Special Operations Command (MARSOC). Renamed for its predecessor, the World War II Marine Raiders, this unit is the principal combat component of MARSOC, which is the Marine Corps' contribution to the United States Special Operations Command (USSOCOM).

History

Origins 
Today's Raiders can trace their roots back to their World War II predecessors the Marine Raiders. The Marine Raiders were units established by the United States Marine Corps to conduct special amphibious light infantry warfare, particularly in landing in rubber boats and operating behind the lines. "Edson's" Raiders of 1st Marine Raiders Battalion and "Carlson's" Raiders of 2nd Marine Raiders Battalion are said to be the first United States special operations forces to form and see combat in World War II.

MCSOCOM Detachment One 
Today's Marine Raiders first saw the light through a pilot program called the Marine Corps Special Operations Command Detachment One, also known as Det 1. In order to first assess the value of Marine special operations forces permanently detached to the United States Special Operations Command, a small unit of 86 men commanded by Col. Robert J. Coates, former commanding officer of 1st Force Reconnaissance Company, was activated on 19 June 2003 and had its headquarters at Camp Del Mar Boat Basin. In 2006 it was disbanded and succeeded by the permanent Marine Corps Special Operations Command (MARSOC). Det 1 deployed to Iraq with Navy SEALs from Naval Special Warfare Group 1 in 2004, Marines from the detachment took part in the Second Battle of Fallujah.

Marine Special Operations Regiment 
In February 2006, the Marine Corps Special Operations Command (MARSOC) was created at Camp Lejeune in North Carolina. The 1st and 2nd Marine Special Operations Battalions were created along with the Marine Special Operations Advisor Group (MSOAG). The majority of the combat personnel assigned to the two battalions were drawn from the Marine Corps Force Reconnaissance community. In April 2009, the MSOAG was redesignated the Marine Special Operations Regiment which then built in a new level of command by making 1st and 2nd MSOB subordinate, and redesignated MSOAG's operational Marines the 3rd Marine Special Operations Battalion.

The first deployment for Marine Raiders was in Afghanistan in 2007. This initial deployment was marked with controversy when elements from Fox Company, 2nd MSOB were involved in a shooting incident. The incident, that resulted in as many as 19 civilians killed, involved a complex ambush by insurgents that included a suicide VBIED and small arms fire. It was alleged that the MARSOC operators killed the civilians while attempting to suppress the enemy firing points. The Marines were relieved from their operational charter in the country and their commander removed from duty by an Army General from USSOCOM after claims were made that the Marines reacted inappropriately and caused excessive civilian casualties. The Marines were later found by a military tribunal to be cleared of wrongdoing. Shortly after a deal was struck to send 2nd MSOB to Helmand province in lieu of the eastern provinces; in late 2007, Golf Company 2nd MSOB was sent to Helmand Province in Support of NATO operations.

In September 2009 the 1st MSOB returned to Afghanistan, this time in command of a joint special operations task force in the northwest of the country. On 10 November 2009, a Marine from 1st MSOB was awarded a Bronze Star with "V" device for his actions during a battle in Farah province. When the remote weapon on his vehicle was destroyed, he climbed on top to man its MK19 grenade launcher, according to his medal citation. As enemy rounds whipped by, Price stayed put—holding his position for four hours and killing "numerous" insurgents in the process.

Following General Petraeus's take over of command in Afghanistan in 2010, in support of the ALP/VSO programme (Afghan Local Police/Village Stability Operations), SOF in Afghanistan were task-organized into battalion level SOTF (Special Operations Task Forces), each with a geographic area of responsibility; for MARSOC, this was western Afghanistan and Helmand Province. In March 2012, Marine Raiders suffered several casualties to Green on Blue attacks. On 29 July 2012, a patrol of Afghan Army Commandos was ambushed by insurgents from a number of buildings in Badghis Province, three Afghans were wounded by small arms fire, Gunnery Sergeants Jonathan Gifford of 2nd MSOB and Daniel Price of 1st MSOB raced forward on an ATV to retrieve the wounded under direct fire from the enemy. After evacuating the wounded to an emergency HLZ (Helicopter Landing Zone) from where they were safely medevaced, they returned to the firefight and assaulted the enemy positions in a fierce close-quarter battle. While throwing grenades down the chimney of an insurgent-occupied building, they were struck and killed by PKM fire, for his actions that day Price was awarded the Silver Star.

The Marine Raiders were deployed supporting the Global War on Terrorism in December 2013 alongside the 26th Marine Expeditionary Unit (Special Operations Capable) where they conducted various special operations missions, ranging from direct action, reconnaissance and other mission sets.

Marine Raider Regiment 
In 2014, it was announced that the Marine Special Operations Regiment and its subordinate units would be renamed Marine Raiders. However, due to administrative delays the renaming did not become official until 19 June 2015.

A Raider from the 3rd Marine Raider Battalion was awarded the Silver Star for his actions during the terrorist attack, on Radisson Blu hotel in Bamako, Mali in November 2015. The Raider led a team that rescued nearly 150 people being held hostage by members of AQIM.

Marine Corps Times reported that during Operation Inherent Resolve, Marine Raiders participated in the campaign to liberate Mosul in Iraq from ISIL. On 20 October 2016, after receiving small arms fire, a team of Raiders from the 2nd Marine Raider Battalion decided to occupy a point between two enemy controlled villages, later they were attacked by roughly 25 militants and an armored vehicle-borne improvised explosive device. A raider Staff Sergeant engaged and suppressed the dismounted enemy force with a sniper rifle, then exposed himself to enemy fire by climbing atop a vehicle to acquire an FGM-148 Javelin anti-tank missile and eventually destroyed the explosive-laden armored vehicle. For his actions during the engagement, the raider was awarded the Silver Star. On 30 December 2016, a Marine from the 2nd Raider Battalion was wounded as a result of enemy action in Iraq.

Marine Corps Times reported that during 2017, Raiders assisted in liberating Marawi in Philippines from ISIS-P militants.

In February 2019, Marine Corps Times reported that since the formation of MARSOC 13 years before, it had conducted 300 operational deployments across 13 countries, awarded more than 300 valor awards, and that 43 Raiders, including two multipurpose canines, had been killed in training and combat operations.

A Marine Raider Master Sergeant from 2nd Marine Raider Battalion was awarded the Silver Star for his actions in a firefight while leading a joint US-Afghan team during a raid on a Taliban stronghold in southern Afghanistan in 2019. Three other Raiders were awarded the Bronze Star for their actions during the firefight.

Organization 

1st Marine Raider Regiment
Headquarters Company
 1st Marine Raider Battalion
 2d Marine Raider Battalion
 3d Marine Raider Battalion

The Marine Raider Regiment is made up of a Headquarters Company and three Marine Raider Battalions (MRB). Each MRB consists of four Marine Special Operations Companies (MSOC) and each company consists of four fourteen-man Marine Special Operations Teams (MSOT).

The base unit of the Raiders is the fourteen-man Marine Special Operations Team (MSOT). Each 14-man MSOT is organized into three elements: a Headquarters (HQ) and two identical Tactical Squads. The HQ element consists of a Special Operations Officer Team Leader (SOO/Captain), Team Chief (Master Sergeant CSO), Operations SNCO (Gunnery Sergeant CSO), and a communication SNCO. Each Tactical Element consists of an Element Leader (Staff Sergeant CSO), three Critical Skills Operators (Sergeant/Corporal CSOs), and a Navy Special Amphibious Reconnaissance Corpsman (SARC). The organization allows a Team to operate on its own if needed but maintains the ability to operate as part of a bigger unit such as an MSOC or SOTF (Special Operations Task Force), similar to Army Special Forces ODA/B.

Mission

Marine Raiders' mission is to provide tailored military combat skills and special operations capability to accomplish special operations missions assigned by the Commander, U.S. Special Operations Command (CDRUSSOCOM) and/or Geographic Combatant Commanders (GCCs) via the Theater Special Operations Command. Marines and Sailors of MARSOC also train, advise and assist friendly host nation forces – including naval and maritime military and paramilitary forces – to enable them to support their governments' internal security and stability, to counter subversion and to reduce the risk of violence from internal and external threats. Raiders' deployments are coordinated by MARSOC, through USSOCOM, in accordance with engagement priorities for Overseas Contingency Operations.

Types of missions 
 Direct action
 Special reconnaissance
 Counter-terrorism
 Foreign internal defense
 Unconventional warfare
 Security force assistance
 Preparation of the environment
 Counter-insurgency
 Maritime Interdiction Operations
 Special/Clandestine operations
 Counter-drug operations

Insertion/extraction techniques
 Patrolling
 Helicopter Touchdown
 Helocast Personnel
 Small Boat/RHIB
 Over-the-Horizon Combat Rubber Raiding Craft (CRRC)
 Rappel
 Fast-roping
 Special Patrol Insertion/Extraction (SPIE)
 Parachute Static Line
 HALO/HAHO parachuting
 SCUBA
 Kayak/Canoe

Training

Screening

Selection of the right personnel begins with a rigorous screening process designed to identify the right Marines for the right billet within MARSOC. Operational billets are open to men and women. Marines who want to serve as Marine Raiders must first attend Assessment and Selection (A&S). All Marines are screened to ensure that the Marines joining MARSOC meet the established prerequisites for duty within the command. The screening takes place in three stages: record screening, physical screening, and a psychological and medical evaluation.

Assessment and selection 
Once a Marine is qualified through the MARSOC Recruiter's screening process, he or she will be assigned to the Assessment and Selection (A&S) Program. A&S is mentally and physically challenging. The program is conducted three times a year at an undisclosed location following the three-week Assessment and Selection Preparatory and Orientation Course.

Phase 1

The three-week A&S Phase 1 course serves as the precursor to the roughly three-week Assessment and Selection Course (A&S), and the nine-month Individual Training Course (ITC), with the purpose of preparing MARSOC Critical Skills Operator candidates for the challenges of A&S.

Aside from the physical training, which includes running, swimming and hiking, the course incorporates a mix of classroom instruction and practical application of basic Marine Corps knowledge and MARSOC and Special Operations Forces fundamentals.

A&S Phase 1 completion does not guarantee selection.

Phase 2

A&S is a mentally and physically challenging evaluation that enables MARSOC to identify Marines that have attributes compatible with special operations missions and the MARSOC way of life. A&S is highly competitive. The program is conducted three times a year at an undisclosed location following the three-week Assessment and Selection Preparatory and Orientation Course.

Individual Training Course 
The Individual Training Course is a physically and mentally challenging nine-month course designed to produce Critical Skills Operators who can operate across the spectrum of special operations in small teams under spartan conditions. ITC uses a building block approach; the training rigor will systematically increase to mimic the complexity and stresses of combat. During ITC students are under constant observation from the instructor cadre as well as their peers. ITC is broken down into four training phases:

Phase 1
Phase 1 trains and evaluates students in the basic skill sets required of all Marine Raiders. Physical fitness, swimming and hand-to-hand combat are stressed in a PT program designed around endurance, functional fitness and amphibious training. This physical training program will continue throughout the course and has been designed to prepare the student for the unique demands of special operations. Field skills including: navigation; patrolling; Survival, Evasion, Resistance, and Escape (SERE); and Tactical Combat Casualty Care (TCCC). Mission planning, fire support training, and extensive communications round out the first phase.

Phase 2
Phase 2 builds upon phase 1, the next phase teaches mission planning, fire support training, small boat operations and scout swimming, demolitions, photography and information collection/reporting and crew-served weapons. A 9-day exercise, "Operation Raider Spirit", is run to evaluate the candidates in patrolling and combat operations. Following on from this, students are taught Special Reconnaissance skills on a 3-week course. The end of phase 2 is an exercise, "Operation Stingray Fury", which tests the ITC students in urban and rural reconnaissance.

Phase 3
Phase 3 focuses on close quarters combat (CQB) operations, phase 3 of the ITC trains the student to high degrees of proficiency in rifle and pistol marksmanship (Combat Marksmanship), CQB Tactics, Techniques and Procedures, demolitions and urban combat skill sets employed by a frontline Marine Special Operations Team (MSOT). Phase 3, which lasts 5 weeks, culminates in a series of simulated raids against urban and rural targets in an exercise named "Operation Guile Strike".

Phase 4
In the final phase, students will receive instruction on irregular warfare operations. The course culminates with "Operation Derna Bridge". Derna Bridge will require the student to use all of the skills mastered throughout the course while training, advising and operating with a Partner Nation/Irregular force. Newly graduated Marine Raiders will be assigned to one of the three Marine Raider Battalions.

Language training
All Marine Raiders are required to undergo continual language training. However, based on ability, certain Marines will be selected for follow-on language training in an Advanced Linguistics Course.

Advanced training

The training of Marine Raiders does not end with ITC. Marines will continue training at their assigned battalion for another 18 months. In addition, the MSOS offers advanced-level courses in a number of subject areas: special reconnaissance, close-quarters battle, sniper, breaching, and weapons employment.
MSOS and advanced training courses:
 Advanced Linguist Course (ALC)
 MARSOF Advanced Sniper Course (MASC)
 MARSOF Close Quarters Battle Level II (MCQBL2)
 Marine Technical Surveillance Course (MTSC)
 MARSOF Dynamic Entry Level II Course (MDEL2)
 Tactical Acquisition Exploitation (SR level II)
 Hostile Forces Tagging Tracking Location (HFTTL)
 Helicopter Rope Suspension Training (HRST)
 Advanced EOD
 Joint Terminal Attack Controller (JTAC)
 Unmanned Aircraft System (UAS) Operator
 Advanced mountain warfare
 Advanced Driving Skills
 Survive, Evade, Resist and Escape (SERE)

Marine Raiders also attend U.S. Army Airborne School and the USMC Combatant Diver Course.

See also
 Marine Corps Reconnaissance Battalions

References

External links

 Marine Raider Regiment homepage
 MARSOC homepage
 https://www.marsoc.com
 ShadowSpear Special Operations MSOR Page
 http://www.military.com/special-operations/joining-marsoc-faq.html
 http://www.americanspecialops.com/marsoc/marsoc-selection-training.php
 http://sadefensejournal.com/wp/?p=1102

Marine Raiders
Military special forces regiments
Regiments of the United States Marine Corps
Military counterterrorist organizations
Special operations units and formations of the United States Marine Corps
Military units and formations established in 2006